Miss South Africa 2011 was held on 11 December 2011 in Sun City, South Africa. The winner will represent South Africa at Miss Universe 2012 and Miss World 2011. 12 contestants competed for the crown. Melinda Bam was crowned Miss South Africa 2011 by the outgoing title holder Bokang Montjane from Johannesburg.

Winner and runners-up
Color keys

Top 12

Judges 
 Sonia Raciti-Oshry
 Joan Ramagoshi
 Sonia Booth
 Kieno Kammies
 Gert Joan Coetzee
 Paledi Segapo

References

External links

2011
2011 beauty pageants
2011 in South Africa
December 2011 events in South Africa